George Thomas Patterson (15 September 1934 – 25 May 2021) was an English former professional footballer. He played as a half-back in the Football League for Hull City, York City and Hartlepools United and in non-League football for Silksworth Juniors, King's Lynn, South Shields, Gateshead and Goole Town.

Patterson died on 25 May 2021 at the age of 86 at York Hospital.

References

1934 births
2021 deaths
Footballers from Sunderland
English footballers
Association football midfielders
Hull City A.F.C. players
King's Lynn F.C. players
South Shields F.C. (1936) players
York City F.C. players
Hartlepool United F.C. players
Gateshead F.C. players
Goole Town F.C. players
English Football League players